Half Gone: Oil, Gas, Hot Air and the Global Energy Crisis is a book by former oil geologist Jeremy Leggett about both oil depletion and global warming.

Media 
Half Gone: Oil, Gas, Hot Air And The Global Energy Crisis, by Jeremy Leggett –  A chilling reminder of the energy catastrophe that we are facing -- Julie Wheelwright -- The Independent 8 December 2005

See also
The Carbon War: Global Warming and the End of the Oil Era

External links 
Carbon War

American political books
Peak oil books
Climate change books
2005 non-fiction books
2005 in the environment
Portobello Books books